Miltochrista inscripta is a moth of the family Erebidae. It was described by Francis Walker in 1854. It is found in eastern China.

References

 

inscripta
Moths described in 1854
Moths of Asia